Eccellenza Piedmont-Aosta Valley is the regional Eccellenza football division for clubs in the regions of Piedmont and Aosta Valley, Italy. It is competed amongst 36 teams, in two different groups (A and B). The winners of the Groups are promoted to Serie D. The clubs who finish second also have the chance to gain promotion, they are entered into a national play-off which consists of two rounds.

Champions
Here are the past champions of the Piedmont-Aosta Valley Eccellenza, organised into their respective group.

Group A

1991–92 Châtillon SV
1992–93 Verbania
1993–94 Borgosesia
1994–95 Derthona  	
1995–96 Verbania		
1996–97 Ivrea
1997–98 Sangiustese
1998–99 Volpiano
1999–2000 Gravellona 	
2000–01 Castellettese
2001–02 Cossatese
2002–03 Barengo Sparta
2003–04 Giaveno Coazze
2004–05 Alessandria
2005–06 Canelli
2006–07 Favria
2007–08 Valle d'Aosta
2008–09 Favria
2009–10 Vallée d’Aoste Saint-Christophe
2010–11 Gozzano	
2011–12 Verbania
2012–13 Borgomanero
2013–14 Pro Settimo & Eureka
2014–15 Gozzano
2015–16 Virtus Verbania
2016–17 Borgaro
2017–18 Stresa
2018–19 ASDC Verbania
2019–20 Pont Donnaz Hone Arnad
2020–21 Romentino Galliate Ticino
2021–22 Stresa

Group B

1991–92 Pinerolo
1992–93 Moncalieri
1993–94 FCV Biellese
1994–95 Saluzzo
1995–96 Fossanese
1996–97 Cuneo
1997–98 Novese
1998–99 Moncalieri
1999–2000 Rivoli
2000–01 Trino
2001–02 Pinerolo
2002–03 Orbassano
2003–04 Novese
2004–05 Saluzzo
2005–06 Rivarolese
2006–07 Derthona
2007–08 Albese
2008–09 Acqui
2009–10 Asti
2010–11 Villalvernia Val Borbera
2011–12 Bra
2012–13 Albese
2013–14 Acqui
2014–15 Pinerolo
2015–16 Casale
2016–17 Castellazzo Bormida
2017–18 Pro Dronero
2018–19 Fossano
2019–20 Derthona
2020–21 Asti
2021–22 Pinerolo

References

External links
Some Club Histories In the League

Pied
Sport in Piedmont
Sport in Aosta Valley
1991 establishments in Italy
Sports leagues established in 1991
Football clubs in Italy
Association football clubs established in 1991